This is a list of episodes from Hero: 108, an animated series created by Yang-Ming Tarng for Cartoon Network.

Note: All the episodes are directed by Trevor Wall and Pongo Kuo; John Fountain co-directed instead nine episodes, and are: "Elephant Castle", "Liger Castle", "Camel Castle", "Parrot Castle", "Turtle Cannon Competition", "Pandaffe Castle", "Eagle Castle", "Baboon Castle", and "Folk Game Competition".

Series overview
{| class="wikitable"
|+ Hero: 108 series overview
|-
! style="padding:0 8px;" rowspan="2" colspan="2"| Season
! style="padding:0 8px;" rowspan="2"| Episodes
! style="padding:0 8px;" rowspan="2"| Segments
! style="padding:0 80px;" colspan="2"| Originally aired
|-
! First aired
! Last aired
|-
| style="background:#00308F;"|
| style="text-align:center;"| 1
| style="text-align:center;"| 26
| style="text-align:center;"| 52
| style="text-align:center;"| 
| style="text-align:center;"| 
|-
| style="background:#006600;"|
| style="text-align:center;"| 2 
| style="text-align:center;"| 26
| style="text-align:center;"| 52
| style="text-align:center;"| 
| style="text-align:center;"| 
|}

Episodes

Season 1 (2010)

Season 2 (2012)

External links
 

Hero: 108 (Cartoon Network series)
Hero: 108 (Cartoon Network series)